Soft Airplane is the third album by Chad VanGaalen, released in 2008 on Flemish Eye and Sub Pop. It was VanGaalen's first album to consist entirely of songs newly recorded for the album; his prior releases compiled tracks from a library of home recordings he had made over a number of years.

The album was shortlisted for the 2009 Polaris Music Prize.

Track listing

References

2008 albums
Chad VanGaalen albums
Flemish Eye albums
Sub Pop albums